John William Dale served as the pulpit minister at Glendale Road Church of Christ in Murray, Kentucky, one of the Church of Christ's largest congregations. His tenure began July 5, 1973 and he retired in 2012. He is married with two children and two grandchildren. He is a Kentucky Colonel and was named to the Board of Trustees of Freed-Hardeman University during their February 2001 annual meeting. His birthday is January 31.

Audio recordings of many of his sermons are made available on the Internet, together with recorded devotionals from local AM radio station WNBS. Sunday morning sermons are longer and more in depth than the evening sermons and radio devotionals: in the latter, Dale may choose a brief text or simple concept to explore for purposes of reflection and exhortation.

Education
John Dale attended Freed-Hardeman University, Oklahoma Christian University, Murray State University, and Vanderbilt University.

He was named "Mr. Freed-Hardeman" in 1966, graduating the same year. He was named Most Outstanding Senior Ministerial Student in 1968. His M.S. degree was conferred by Murray State University in 1970, with graduate work at Vanderbilt University and Louisiana Baptist University (an unaccredited institution).

Theology
In his pulpit sermons, Dale presents a mainstream conservative Church of Christ viewpoint.

Creation
Though not insisting on a 24-hour day of the Creation story of Genesis, Dale says he believes in it, and that those that believe in its impossibility have a great theological problem. He states that the universe was created with the "appearance of age." Dale also denies theistic evolution.

Test of faith
While Dale was still young, his mother was confined to a mental institution. Shortly after her discharge, she committed suicide. Although Dale rarely speaks of this in sermons, he has acknowledged in interviews that the tragedy resulted in significant soul-searching (particularly on the question of whether his mother was condemned to Hell). He ultimately decided that God is the only fair and just judge of people's souls, a determination that strengthened his faith.

Community involvement
John Dale is a hands-on minister in his community, officiating at many weddings and funerals in the area. He is well known and respected in the public sphere of the broader community outside the congregation in which he is employed (he is a member of the local Hospice Board), and enjoys good relations with other sectors of the clerical community, with the notable exception of vocal critics within local congregations of non-Institutional Churches of Christ.

Dale was the guest speaker for the Leadership Commitment Event held at Hilldale Church of Christ in Clarksville, Tennessee on April 24, 1997.

In 1999, Dale was named Citizen of the Year by the Murray Chamber of Commerce.

Jubilee 2000 Revival
On Tuesday, September 26, 2000, Dale spoke to the congregants of St. Leo's Catholic Church in Murray during that church's "Jubilee 2000 Revival" program, organized to combat a decline in Catholic Church membership due to perceptions of exclusivity and intolerance towards other religious groups. The program was part of the larger Great Jubilee called for the year 2000 by John Paul II and celebrated by many Catholic and non-Catholic Christians around the world. In Murray, Dale would speak before a minority Catholic group: his own congregation numbered some tenfold the membership of Murray's lone Catholic parish.

Dale was supported by elders and congregants from his own congregation who also attended the event. His topic was "Living Jubilee in Murray & Calloway County," or "Jubilee--What We Can Do Here in Murray/Calloway County?" Carolyn Haas reported on the event in the December 2000 edition of the Owensboro diocesan newsletter, in part featuring a quotation that would later be disputed, in part, by Dale himself:

On Tuesday we welcomed Pulpit Minister John Dole [sic] from Murray's Glendale Church of Christ. We had all pews full as many Glendale Church of Christ members came to support both John Dale and our Revival. His topic was "Jubilee--What We Can Do Here in Murray/Calloway County?" Rev. Dole [sic] commented, "I appreciate this opportunity. Ray had told me, 'Just come, do whatever you want to do, say whatever you want to say. I trust you. You are not on trial.' I appreciate that. You are very warm and welcoming."

He urged us all to continue to work together, reminded us that Jesus' blood was shed for all. He read  to explain how the peoples waited for the Messiah! Christ would come and bring about freedom from sin and blood shed for all to come before and after. "Christ shed His blood for all mankind - no exceptions," John said, and continued with praise for our community. He also had admonitions: go and sin no more. We were treated to a cappella singing as Song Director Curtis Darnall from Glendale Church led us all in seven songs; St. Leo's rafters rang with enormous voice power.

Nearly six years later, on June 4, 2006, after the present article was created, Dale took issue with part of this quotation in his Sunday morning sermon:

"By the way, some of you have been reading wikipedia.com. I'm featured there. I'm so honored to be included there in what is sometimes little more than a scandalous website. But when you read there that I referred to Ray Gates as "Father Ray," I want you to know, with all due respect to everybody, it ain't so. It never happened. I will deny it until my tongue cleaves to the roof of my mouth and I can't get enough breath to say another word. It didn't happen. And it won't happen. He's not my father. I have a heavenly father who's in a class all by himself. I had an earthly father who in my opinion was in a class all by himself.

"And back in 2000 when we were doing all of these things with the Jubilee 2000 Celebration and the time that I appeared there on their program, Ray Gates (who was the parish priest at that time at St. Leo's Church here in Murray) when he and I talked about that we agreed early on: I'm John and he's Ray. And I didn't mean to be disrespectful and he didn't either. When you call me by my first name I don't consider it disrespectful. Jesus said, 'Don't call any man on Earth father.'"

In disputing the diocesan newsletter's characterisation of his remarks, Dale was pointing out one of the tenets of his faith, that the styling of priests and other high members of the church, as "Father," a common practice in the Catholic Church, is not accepted among the Churches of Christ. Within the Churches of Christ, only God is referred to as the "Holy Father," while ministers and elders are referred to as "brothers in Christ."

Criticism
Immediately following the 2000 event, Dale was derided as a "liberal" and as doctrinally "impure" for his participation in the event by some vocal critics in the Church of Christ community.

Criticism was not long in coming, largely from conservative elements of local churches of Christ in the nearby communities of Almo and Princeton, but also from as far away as El Paso, Texas. Dale drew fire for his participation in the ecumenical effort of the St. Leo Catholic Church because he offered no criticism of the doctrines or practices of the Catholic Church while assisting them in their effort. Dale said that he was proud of the way in which different religious groups co-existed peacefully within the local community and even went on to minimize any differences between them declaring that even he and his wife "didn't agree on everything." Critics pointed out that Dale's participation in the event coupled with the conciliatory message he delivered only served to assist the Catholic Church in their ecumenical effort to improve their image. They identified this as a violation of Eph. 5:11 and 2 John 9. Criticism came from conservative commentators such as Michael Heath,  Walter W. Pigg, and non-institutionalist Brian Yeager.

In his response to one letter of protest from Walter Pigg, Dale distinguished his role at the event as "communication," and attempted to distance himself from the term "fellowship:"

My presence and participation in the program at St. Leo's was intended as the seizing of an opportunity to communicate with some of my religious neighbors with whom I do not share fellowship, but with whom I sincerely seek more and better discussion.

However, during his participation in the event Dale made no attempt to point out that he did not share fellowship with them.

The same critic of Dale brought the issue up again in April 2001, following his appointment to the Board of Trustees of Freed-Hardeman University, aligning Dale with "liberal" figures such as Walt Leaver, Randy Harris, and F. LaGard Smith, and expressing disdain for the faculties of David Lipscomb University and Freed-Hardeman University.

Media
According to his church's web site, John Dale is heard on a daily radio program on local radio station WNBS in Murray, Kentucky (which derives its call sign from the initials of local 19th century pre-Marconi wireless (induction) voice telephony pioneer Nathan B. Stubblefield.)

References

External links
Glendale Road Church of Christ

American religious leaders
Ministers of the Churches of Christ
American members of the Churches of Christ
Year of birth missing (living people)
Living people
Murray State University alumni
Vanderbilt University alumni
Freed–Hardeman University alumni